Edward Sargent may refer to:
 Edward Sargent (architect), American architect
 Edward Sargent (bishop), Anglican priest
 Edward H. Sargent, Canadian scientist
 Eddie Sargent, politician in Ontario, Canada